Naduiyeh-ye Sofla (also Romanized as Nadū’īyeh-ye Soflá) is a village in Rezvan Rural District, Jebalbarez District, Jiroft County, Kerman Province, Iran. At the 2006 census, its population was 39, in 10 families.

References 

Populated places in Jiroft County